Easington may refer to one of several places:
in England
Easington, Lancashire, Forest of Bowland
Easington, County Durham, a town in County Durham
Easington District, a local government district in County Durham
Easington (UK Parliament constituency), constituency represented in the British House of Commons
Easington Colliery, a village in County Durham
Easington Lane, a village in County Durham
Easington, Buckinghamshire
Easington, Cherwell
Easington, East Riding of Yorkshire, the location of the Easington Gas Terminal
Easington, South Oxfordshire
Easington, North Yorkshire
Easington, Northumberland

elsewhere
Easington, Jamaica

See also
Eastington (disambiguation)